Michael Kporvi (born 24 February 1995) is a Ghanaian footballer who plays as a forward for NEROCA in the I-League.

Club career
Kporvi started playing for the local club AC Sondisco, and made his senior debut for the club in 2012, aged only 16. On 14 April 2016, he signed a three-year deal with the Tema-based local club Tema Youth F.C.

He signed a one-year deal with Senegalese giants ASC Diaraf in October 2018. He represented Diaraf in the CAF Champions League.

On 21 July 2019, Kporvi signed a one-year contract with Sudanese giants Al-Merrikh SC.

NEROCA 
On 6 January 2023, I-League club NEROCA announced the signing of Kporvi till the end of the season.

References

External links
 

1995 births
Living people
Ghanaian footballers
Association football forwards
ASC Jaraaf players
Tema Youth players
Ghanaian expatriate footballers